The Deputy Chief Minister of Himachal Pradesh is the seniormost cabinet member of the state government who serves as the de facto second head of the state. He is the second highest ranking executive authority of the state's council of ministers. The first and current deputy chief minister of Himachal Pradesh is Mukesh Agnihotri, serving in office since 11 December 2022.

List

References

 
Himachal Pradesh